Giorgio Lattanzi (born 26 January 1939) is an Italian judge. He was Judge of the Constitutional Court of Italy from 9 December 2010 to 9 December 2019 and President from 8 March 2018 until the end of his mandate.

Career
Lattanzi was born in Rome. Before his appointment to the Constitutional Court he served as President of Section of the Court of Cassation. He was appointed by the Court of Cassation to the Constitutional Court on 19 November 2010, and sworn into office on 9 December 2010. He was elected Vice President of the Court on 12 November 2014. On 8 March 2018 Lattanzi was elected president, he received 12 votes in favour and one blank. In October 2019 the  Constitutional Court received severe criticism from political leaders Matteo Salvini and Nicola Zingaretti for a ruling regarding the rights of mafia-related convicts sentenced to life imprisonment. Lattanzi indicated that the criticism reached unacceptable levels, stating "..criticism is one thing, an attack is another." On 9 December 2019 Lattanzi's term in the  Constitutional Court ended and he was succeeded as president by Marta Cartabia.

Lattanzi was made Knight Grand Cross in the Order of Merit of the Italian Republic on 24 October 2011.

References

1939 births
Living people
Judges from Rome
Judges of the Constitutional Court of Italy
Presidents of the Constitutional Court of Italy
Vice Presidents of the Constitutional Court of Italy
Knights Grand Cross of the Order of Merit of the Italian Republic